Falling for You is a 1933 British comedy film directed by Robert Stevenson and Jack Hulbert, and starring Jack Hulbert and Cicely Courtneidge.

Plot
Rival journalists Jack and Minnie (Hulbert and Courtneidge) compete for a scoop about a missing heiress (Tamara Desni). When they track her down to Switzerland, Jack falls for her and Minnie gets to write up the story.

Cast
Jack Hulbert as Jack Hazeldon
Cicely Courtneidge as Minnie Tucker
Tamara Desni as Sondra von Moyden
Garry Marsh as Archduke Karl
Alfred Drayton as News editor
Toni Edgar-Bruce as Aunt Alice (as Tonie Bruce)
O. B. Clarence as Trubshawe
Morton Selten as Caldicott
Ivor McLaren as The Sweep (as Ivor McClaren)
Leo Sheffield as The Butler

Critical reception
TV Guide gave it two out of five stars, and wrote, "Okay comedy features Hulbert singing three songs and dancing on skis."

References

External links

1933 films
1933 comedy films
1930s English-language films
Films directed by Robert Stevenson
Films directed by Jack Hulbert
British comedy films
British black-and-white films
1930s British films